ProRealTime is a technical analysis software designed and developed in France by IT-Finance.
It consists of an electronic trading platform and a technical analysis software used to analyse financial markets.

References

External links 
 Official website

Financial software
Financial markets
Technical analysis software
Electronic trading systems